Pachymerium antipai is a species of centipede in Geophilidae family that is endemic to Portugal.

References

Geophilomorpha
Animals described in 1968
Endemic arthropods of Portugal
Myriapods of Europe